Xiomara Hortencia Zelaya Castro (born 14 January 1985) is a Honduran politician and member of the National Congress. She is the daughter of Presidents Manuel Zelaya and Xiomara Castro. She is popularly known by her nickname "Pichu". 

Zelaya was a potential presidential candidate in 2021, however, she chose to run for a deputy.

References 

1985 births
21st-century Honduran women politicians
21st-century Honduran politicians
Liberty and Refoundation politicians
Living people
People from Olancho Department
Deputies of the National Congress of Honduras
Honduran Roman Catholics
Honduran people of Basque descent
Honduran people of Spanish descent